Dylan Darmohoetomo (born 22 December 1992) is a Surinamese badminton player and coach. He is a member of the Surinamese badminton club Perfect Flying Feathers (P.F.F.). He was the flagbearer for Suriname at the 2019 Pan Am Games

Career 
Already in 2001 Dylan won the National junior Mixed Doubles title followed in 2002 by the National Boys Doubles U-11 & U-13 titles. Many more junior titles followed in the years there after. Most of his Boys Doubles junior titles were with his friend and long time doubles partner Irfan Djabar. In 2007 Dylan became the National U-19 Boys Singles champion of Suriname. Dylan took the Pan Am Juniors 2009 Bronze medal Boys Doubles U-19. He won a silver medal as runner-up at the South American Juniors Championships 2010 in the U-19 category in Teresina, Brazil. Also taking two gold medals at the same event winning both the Boys Doubles U-19 with Irfan Djabar and the Mixed Doubles U-19 with Arantxa Ilahibaks. Dylan was the "Most Promising Badminton Junior Player in 2010" from Suriname.

Dylan won his first adult National title in Suriname in 2010 in Mixed Doubles with Crystal Leefmans. It took five years before he won another National title. This time in 2015 it even was a triple championship winning in Men's Singles, Men's Doubles and Mixed Doubles. He won the National Men's doubles title again in 2017 with doubles partner Gilmar Jones.

Dylan participated for Suriname at the 2014 CACSO Games in Veracruz, Mexico and also at three consecutive Pan Am Games, the 2011 Pan Am Games in Guadalajara, Mexico, the 2015 Pan Am Games in Toronto, Ontario, Canada and also the 2019 Pan Am Games in Lima, Peru. In 2013 Dylan participated at the 2013 Summer Universiade in Kazan, Russia. where he lost against Michał Rogalski from Poland (12-21, 13-21). In 2017 Dylan participated in the 2017 Summer Universiade in Taipei, Taiwan, where he managed to win two rounds against Mark Banda from Zambia and Shailesh Dahal from Nepal, before losing to Daniel Fan from Australia with 15-21, 17-21 in the round of 32 of the Men's Singles event.

His biggest international achievements to date are winning the Caribbean Carebaco International title at home in Mixed Doubles with Crystal Leefmans in 2018 and winning the Men's Doubles with Gilmar Jones in 2016 at the Carebaco International in Aruba. Dylan Darmohoetomo previously reached the semi-finals in the men's doubles category at the 2012 Carebaco International at Santo Domingo with his former doubles partner Irfan Djabar.

Dylan followed the coach level 1 & 2 Course in Kingston, Jamaica in January 2019.
Dylan completed his coach level 3 course  when this BWF Coach Level 3 Continental Pilot Course was held in Lima, Peru in November 2019.

Achievements

BWF International Challenge/Series 
Men's doubles

Mixed doubles

  BWF International Challenge tournament
  BWF International Series tournament
  BWF Future Series tournament

South American Junior Championships 
Boys' singles U-19 

Boys' doubles U-19 

Mixed doubles U-19

References

External links 
 
 

1992 births
Living people
Surinamese people of Javanese descent
Surinamese male badminton players
Badminton players at the 2011 Pan American Games
Badminton players at the 2015 Pan American Games
Badminton players at the 2019 Pan American Games
Pan American Games competitors for Suriname
Competitors at the 2014 Central American and Caribbean Games
Competitors at the 2010 Central American and Caribbean Games